Events in the year 2018 in Togo.

Incumbents
 President: Faure Gnassingbé
 Prime Minister: Komi Sélom Klassou

Events

January: the 2017–18 Togolese protests continue

Deaths

2 February – Fábio Pereira de Azevedo, footballer (b. 1977).

References

 
2010s in Togo
Years of the 21st century in Togo
Togo
Togo